Pseudonocardia dioxanivorans is a Gram-positive bacterium from the genus of Pseudonocardia which has been isolated from industrial sludge which was contaminated with 1,4-dioxane in the United States.

References

Pseudonocardia
Bacteria described in 2005